Aedena Cycle is a former Norwegian electronic music group from Tromsø, composed of Torbjørn Brundtland and Svein Berge (from Röyksopp), Kolbjørn Lyslo and Gaute Barlindhaug.  The quartet released an EP called "The Travellers' Dream EP" on R&S/Apollo in 1994. This was the first official release involving Berge and Brundtland, who later formed the world-renowned group Röyksopp.

After this, Aedena Cycle was a solo project, with only Barlindhaug left from the original line up. Barlindhaug released two albums on Beatservice Records as Aedena Cycle. The album "Albite" came out in 1997 and "Cargo Cult" was released in 1999.

In 2001 Barlindhaug had to change the artist name from Aedena Cycle to Kolar Goi because the creator of the American graphic novel The Aedena Cycle had the copyright to the name.

Kolbjørn Lyslo now figures under the artist name Doc L. Jnr.

See also
 Röyksopp
 Svein Berge
 Torbjørn Brundtland
 Alanïa
 Drum Island
 Beatservice Records

External links 
 Aedena Cycle at Last.fm
 Aedena Cycle discography at Discogs

References 

Norwegian electronic musicians
Norwegian ambient music groups
Musical groups established in 1994
1994 establishments in Norway
Musical groups disestablished in 1999
1999 disestablishments in Norway
Musical groups from Tromsø